Mari Ekeløf Chauhan (born 17 November 1988) is a Norwegian beauty pageant titleholder of Indian descent who was crowned Miss Norway 2013 and represented her country at the Miss Universe 2013 in Moscow, Russia.

Early life
Born in Hamar, Chauhan is a Norwegian model. Chauhan is of partial Indian descent.

Miss Norway 2013
Mari Ekeløf Chauhan is Miss Norway 2013. She was crowned on September 28 at a contest held in Scandic Hotell Fornebu. She then competed at the Miss Universe 2013 contest, held in Moscow on November 9, 2013, but failed to place.

References

External links
Official Miss Universe Norway website

1988 births
Living people
Miss Universe 2013 contestants
Norwegian female models
Norwegian people of Indian descent
People from Hamar